Helen is a 2019 Indian Malayalam-language survival thriller film directed by Mathukutty Xavier (in his directorial debut) and produced by Vineeth Sreenivasan under the companies Habit of Life and Big Bang Entertainments. The film stars Anna Ben in the title role, while Lal, Noble Babu Thomas, Aju Varghese, Rony David and Binu Pappu appears in supporting roles. It was written by Alfred Kurian Joseph, Noble Babu Thomas and Mathukutty Xavier. Its soundtrack was composed by Shaan Rahman.

Helen was released on 15 November 2019. The film won two National Film Awards – Best Debut Film of a Director and Best Make-up Artist (Ranjith Ambady) – and Ben won the Kerala State Film Award – Special Jury Award. It was remade into Tamil as Anbirkiniyal (2021), and in Hindi by the same director as Mili (2022).

Plot 
Helen Paul is a B.Sc Nursing graduate and attends IELTS coaching classes intended for a job abroad. She works part-time at a restaurant named The Chicken Hub, inside a plush mall. She lives with her father, Paul, an insurance agent. He does not like her going abroad. Paul is a conservative Christian and has disagreement with Helen associating with non-Christian friends. Unbeknownst to Paul, Helen has a Muslim boyfriend, Azhar, who is in search of a job.

One night, while Azhar is riding Helen to her home, they are stopped by police who penalise him for not wearing a helmet and drunken driving, they both are brought to the police station. Paul is summoned to the station. Paul is in dismay of seeing his daughter and does not talk to her despite her several attempts of creating conversation.

The next night after work at the Chicken Hub, Helen's manager Jayashankar unknowingly locks her in the freezer room. At -18 °C, Helen has to survive in the freezing cold and tries everything to keep herself alive. She tries to block the evaporator fan but ended up dislocating her leg. She starts to get frostbite and bleeding through her nose.

Her father starts getting worried that Helen has not reached home. He searches for Helen with the help of his neighbor. They call all her co-workers but they all said they do not know anything. Azhar, who was on his way to Chennai half-heartedly, returns and also joins the investigation.

They go to the police station to file a complaint but they are greeted by the SI Ratheesh Kumar, whom they met yesterday. He suspects Azhar. Paul tries to defend him and this causes a feud between the sub-inspector and the search party. He deliberately tries not to help them by not sharing the last tower location of Helen he got from Cyber cell.

They get a clue that Helen might have had a problem with the auto drivers in front of the mall. They all reach there to enquire. The auto driver whom they suspected denied the allegation. At this point, they meet a watchman of the mall who says that Helen might not have left the mall because he usually notices her going in and out.

They rush to the Chicken Hub and opens the freezer. In the end, after 5 hours, they find Helen. She is taken to the hospital just before she had the last stage of hypothermia. Then Paul enquires with the watchman that how was he sure about the fact that Helen didn't leave the mall. Helen smiles at him every time she comes in and out of the mall. He did not see her go out on the day of her missing.

Helen reunites with her father and boyfriend. The doctor says that she is out of danger and she needs physiotherapy later. He continues that its difficult for any common man or woman to survive that cold weather and Helen is a brave girl. When the watchman asks Paul what his daughter's name is, Paul proudly replies, "Helen".

Cast 

 Anna Ben as Helen Paul
 Lal as Paul, Helen's father
 Noble Babu Thomas as Azhar
 Aju Varghese as SI Ratheesh Kumar
 Rony David as Jayashankar
 Binu Pappu as CI Ravi Prakash
 Bonny Mary Mathew as Littu
 Jayaraj as Mall security
 Vineeth Sreenivasan as Kanchan, Jail convict (cameo)
 Kookal Raghavan as Raghavan
 Lakshmi Marikar as Helen's friend
 Lali Marikar as Azhar's mother
 Thrissur Elsy as Devamma
 Adinadu Sasi as Constable Sudevan
 Vinu Vijayakumar as Jins Babu
 Srikant Murali as Doctor
 Krishna as man who hits Azhar's bike in accident
 Nazrudeen Valiyaveettil as North Indian Mall security guard
 Malavika Wales

Production 
According to Mathukutty Xavier, he wanted to make a survival thriller as there were not many Malayalam films made on that genre since the 1992 film Malootty. The story was inspired from an incident that had taken place abroad. While writing, they had visited meat freezers in Aroor and Alappuzha and met workers who had been stuck in freezers for 5–6 hours. Eventually, a girl getting trapped in a meat freezer became its basic thread. Similar incidents reported in newspaper were referred and formed a fictional plot. Characters such as the girl's father and boyfriend were brought in to make it emotionally connected to the audience. Their motive was to target family and youth audience. After completing the script Xavier went to meet Vineeth Sreenivasan for his feedback. On hearing the script halfway through, Vineeth expressed interest in producing the film.

On 1 August 2019, Vineeth Sreenivasan announced the film with Anna Ben in the lead role and a title poster was released. It was reported Lal would play Helen's father and Noble Babu Thomas was paired opposite Anna. It was reported to be a woman-centric film, in which Anna plays a girl who works in a fast food joint in Kochi.

Soundtrack 

On 1 November 2019, the first song of the film titled "Pon Thaarame" sung by Vineeth Sreenivasan and Divya S. Menon was released. Composed by Shaan Rahman, its lyrics were written by Vinayak Sasikumar, Vineeth Sreenivasan and Manu Manjith.

Release 
The film was released on 15 November 2019. Funtastic Films headed by Visakh Subramaniam and Aju Varghese was in charge of the film's distribution.

Reception 
Rating 4 out of 5 stars, Sajin Shrijith of The New Indian Express wrote: "It’s one of those rare survival dramas where innovative ideas are strongly backed by nail-biting tension and emotional stakes." He praised Anna Ben's performance: "Anna Ben, who made a terrific debut in Kumbalangi Nights, proves with Helen that she is not a one-hit-wonder." Sify rated the movie 4 out of 5 stating: "Helen is the kind of movie that start affecting you slowly and shakes up totally by the time the end titles start rolling." Also praising Aju Varghese's performance, the review concluded: "Watch out for a brilliant show from Aju Varghese, who is doing a character that has a different shade from usual." Anna M. M. Vetticad of Firstpost awarded 3.5 in a scale of 5 and gave the verdict: "Helen is right up there with the best of 2019." Anjana George of The Times of India rated it 3.5 out of 5 stars and commented: "A heart rending survival drama." She praised Anend C. Chandran's cinematography and Shaan Rahman's music: "With a lot of close-up shots and colourful visuals, Anend C Chandran's cinematography amps up the movie's pace. Shaan Rahman comes up with some fab music." She also added: "Helen is a typical family film from the Vineeth Sreenivasan school of filmmaking which is enjoyable and empathetic. The feel-good movie, though a survival drama, would definitely bring a smile to the faces as the curtains come down." Litty Simon of Malayala Manorama said that "... Mathukutty Xavier's Helen played by Anna Ben is all set to make thousands of movie-goers her staunch fans in the coming days." She added: "The storytelling is easygoing and naturalistic. Some thrilling moments in the film make us believe that the director is definitely here to stay." She also praised its editing and cinematography: "Shameer Muhammed's crisp editing and Anand C. Chandran's cinematography helped develop this heart-warming tale of survival."

Awards

Remakes 
The film was remade in Tamil as Anbirkiniyal (2021). It was also remade in Hindi as Mili (2022) by the same director. Lohit H. of Friday Films acquired the remake rights for Kannada, which is to be directed by debutants Arunkumar M. and Sabu Aloysius. Lasya Nagaraj was confirmed to play the central character. The film will also have a Telugu remake starring Anupama Parameswaran. Prasad V. Potluri will be producing the film which will be directed by debutant Hanuman Chowdary.

References

External links 
 

2010s Malayalam-language films
2010s survival films
2019 thriller films
Best Debut Feature Film of a Director National Film Award winners
Films about father–daughter relationships
Films scored by Shaan Rahman
Films shot in Kochi
Indian survival films
Indian thriller films
Malayalam films remade in other languages